David "Dave" Moffatt is an English former professional rugby league footballer who played in the 1980s. He played at club level for Mirehouse ARLFC (in Whitehaven, of the West Cumbria League, founded by Eddie Bowman) and Workington Town.

Playing career

Club career
David Moffatt made his début, and he played his last match, for Workington Town in the 6-24 defeat by Castleford during the 1984–85 season at Derwent Park, Workington on Sunday 6 January 1985.

References

External links
Search for "David Moffatt" at britishnewspaperarchive.co.uk
Search for "Dave Moffatt" at britishnewspaperarchive.co.uk

1960s births
Living people
English rugby league players
Place of birth missing (living people)
Rugby league players from Cumbria
Workington Town players
Year of birth missing (living people)